This list of stars that have unusual dimming periods is a table of stars that have been observed to darken and brighten and don't appear to be eclipsing binaries or intrinsic variables. It's based on studies searching for analogs of Tabby's Star.

The listing here is ordered alphabetically.


List

See also

 BD+20°307
 Disrupted planet
 Ecliptic Plane Input Catalog (EPIC)
 Gaia16aye
 Lists of astronomical objects
 List of semiregular variable stars
 Lists of stars
 List of variable stars
 Search for extraterrestrial intelligence
 WD 0145+234 (star disrupting an exoasteroid)

Notes

References

External links
 SIMBAD Astronomical Database by the Centre de données astronomiques de Strasbourg

Dim
Stars, dim